José Trajano Mera Iturralde (1862 in Ambato – 1919 in Guayaquil) was an Ecuadorian poet, playwright and diplomat from a literary family with a cultural lineage. His father was the writer Juan León Mera who wrote Ecuador's first novel Cumanda and the text of the Ecuadorian National Anthem.

He earned a degree in jurisprudence from the Central University of Ecuador. He died in Guayaquil in 1919 while holding the position of Undersecretary of the Ministry of Foreign Relations.

Works
 Cónsules y Consulados (1910; Consuls and Consulates)
 Los virtuosos (1917; The Virtuous)
 La visita del poeta (The Poet's Visit)
 Paz en la guerra (1911; War in Peace)
 Sonetos y Sonetillos (1909; Sonnets and Little Sonnets)
 El reino de Bélgica: su comercio é industria (1909; The Belgium Kingdom: its commerce and industry)

References 

1862 births
1919 deaths
20th-century Ecuadorian poets
Ecuadorian dramatists and playwrights
People from Ambato, Ecuador
Central University of Ecuador alumni
Ecuadorian male poets
20th-century male writers